

Number length

All telephone numbers are 11 digits long (initial 0 plus ten numbers). The first two or three digits after the zero are the area code. The possibilities are: (+98)  (for landlines), (for cellphones) and (for MVNO).

When making a call within the same landline area code, initial 0 plus the area code can be omitted.

Example for calling
The international call prefix depends on the country you are calling from; e.g., 00 for most European countries, and 011 from North America. For domestic calls (within the country), 0 must be dialed before the area code. The prefix for international calls from Iran is 00 (e.g., for a United States number 00 1 ... should be dialled).

An example for calling telephones in the city of Tehran is as follows:

 xxxx xxxx (within Tehran, via a landline)
 021 xxxx xxxx (within Iran but either outside Tehran or via a cellphone)
 +98 21 xxxx xxxx (outside Iran)

An example for mobile numbers is as follows:
 09xx xxx xxxx (in Iran)
 +98 9xx xxx xxxx (outside Iran)

Landlines
Originally, there was only one provider of landline telephony, Telecommunication Company of Iran.

Area code

Landlines telephone numbers have these formats: (0ac) xxxx xxxx (within Iran) and +98 ac xxxx xxxx (outside Iran). ac (area code) shown in the list below:

Premium-rate telephone number

Premium-rate telephone number has these formats : 
7020 xxxx: Provincial
7070 xxxx: access from all provinces
909 aac xxxx. aac (available area code) shown in below list :
only landline numbers can call these numbers

Free phone numbers

Free phone numbers have these formats :
900 212 xxxx
9000 xxxx
only landline numbers can call these numbers

Personal number service

Personal number service has this format : 8080 xxxx

SIP Trunk
 Provincial needs an area code by landline in different province or via a cellphone
9100 xxxx: ShatelTalk (Shatel)
9101 xxxx: AsiaTel (AsiaTech)
9102 xxxx: SabaTel (SabaNet)
9103 xxxx: Fanap Telecom
9107 xxxx: NexFon (Respina)
9108 xxxx: FanAva
9109 xxxx: Pishgaman
9130 xxxx: AsiaTel (AsiaTech)
9131 xxxx: Lazer
9132 xxxx: Shatel
9155 xxxx: TakNet
9311 xxxx: Wenex (Ertebatat-e Farzanegan Pars)
9411 xxxx: AloIran (MacTel, MagTel, Montazeran-e Adl Gostar) (Not Working)
9511 xxxx: Arian Rasaneh Pars (Not Working)
966x xxxx: AloTehran (Zoha Kish, Mehr Media)
9686 xxxx: AloTehran (Zoha Kish, Mehr Media)

 Country
94220 xxxxx: AsiaTel
94260 xxxxx: NexFon

Universal access number

This service allows a subscriber to publish a national number and have the incoming calls routed to different destinations based on various criteria such as the geographical location of the caller, the time of day and the date on which the call is made.
only landline numbers can call these numbers

Universal access number has these formats :
909 221 xxxx
8081 xxxx

Mobile phones
In order to identify the country which a mobile subscriber belongs to, in wireless telephone networks (GSM, CDMA, UMTS, etc.) Mobile Country Codes (MCC) are used.
MCC is allocated by the International Telecommunication Union (ITU) and MCC for Iran is 432.

If you intend to use your SIM card, make sure to put your phone on flight mode after using SIM cards from Iranian companies. Irancell, Hamrah Aval and RighTel are the main 3 phone operators in Iran. Fortunately the existing mobile network provides 4G & 5G cellular data coverage in all the small and big cities around the country. Also in most of the main roads between cities you can have access to call and data services.

In order to identify mobile subscriber in a country, Mobile Network Code (MNC) are used.
MNC is allocated by the national regulator. (e.g. MNC for IR-MCI is 11)

The Home Network Identity (HNI) is the combination of the MCC and the MNC. This is the number which fully identifies a mobile subscriber. This combination is also known as the PLMN. (e.g. HNI for IR-MCI with MNC = 11 and MCC of Iran = 432 will be 43211)

There are 9 mobile phone providers in Iran, listed below.

IR-MCI (HNI : 43211)
 0910-xxx-xxxx
 0911-xxx-xxxx (mobile owner lives in Area 1)
 0912-xxx-xxxx (mobile owner lives in Area 2)
 0913-xxx-xxxx (mobile owner lives in Area 3)
 0914-xxx-xxxx (mobile owner lives in Area 4)
 0915-xxx-xxxx (mobile owner lives in Area 5)
 0916-xxx-xxxx (mobile owner lives in Area 6)
 0917-xxx-xxxx (mobile owner lives in Area 7)
 0918-xxx-xxxx (mobile owner lives in Area 8)
 0919-xxx-xxxx (mobile owner lives in Area 2)
 0990-xxx-xxxx (pre-paid)
 0991-xxx-xxxx
 0992-xxx-xxxx (pre-paid)
 0993-xxx-xxxx (pre-paid)
 0994-xxx-xxxx (pre-paid and data SIM)
 2nd digit after 091 is the code of mobile number. 09124xxxxxx is code4 or 09121xxxxxx is code1. The lowest code has the highest price, meaning that the owner is (probably) wealthier.

Premium-rate telephone
Premium-rate telephone number for IR-MCI has this format : 9922-xxxx
only IR-MCI numbers can call these numbers

Espadan (HNI : 43219)
 only in Isfahan province
 0931-xxx-xxxx pre-paid.

MTCE (HNI : 43270)

Iraphone (HNI : 43290)
 only in Gheshm island

Taliya (HNI : 43232)
 0932-xxx-xxxx

TeleKish (HNI : 43214)
 0934-xxx-xxxx post-paid

MTN Irancell (HNI : 43235)
 0900-xxx-xxxx
 0901-xxx-xxxx
 0902-xxx-xxxx
 0903-xxx-xxxx
 0904-xxx-xxxx
 0905-xxx-xxxx
 0930-xxx-xxxx
 0933-xxx-xxxx
 0935-xxx-xxxx
 0936-xxx-xxxx
 0937-xxx-xxxx
 0938-xxx-xxxx
 0939-xxx-xxxx
 pre-paid, post-paid and data SIM
 0941-xxx-xxxx (special for TD-LTE)

RighTel (HNI : 43220 & 43221)
 0920-xxx-xxxx post-paid
 0921-xxx-xxxx pre-paid & data SIM
 0922-xxx-xxxx pre-paid & data SIM

MobinNet (HNI : 43240)
 0955-xxx-xxxx (special for TD-LTE)

Mobile Virtual Network Operator (MVNO)

Shatel Mobile (HNI : 43208 & 43250)
0998-1xx-xxxx pre-paid & data SIM

PH.Lotus
0999-0xx-xxxx pre-paid

UpTel & AzarTel (NeginTel) (HNI : 43202)
0999-1xxx-xxx post-paid

Avacell (HiWeb) (HNI : 43212)
0999-14xx-xxx pre-paid

SamanTel (HNI : 43210)
 0999-99x-xxxx post-paid
 0999-98x-xxxx pre-paid & data SIM

Farabord Dadeh Haye Iranian Co. (Zi-Tel) (HNI : 43245)
 0999-99x-xxxx data SIM

Ertebatat-e Arian Tel Co. (Arian-Tel) (HNI : 43206)
 0999-87x-xxxx
 0999-88x-xxxx
 0999-89x-xxxx

Ertebatat-e Farzanegan Pars (Wenex) (HNI : 43293)
 data SIM

Emergency numbers 
The following numbers are used for emergency services within Iran

110 - Police

112 - Hilal Ahmar Ambulance

115 - Ambulance

125 - Fire Department

911 - Redirected to 112 on mobile phones

See also
 List of dialling codes in Iran
 Mobile Telecommunication Company of Iran
 MTN Irancell
 RighTel Communications
 Shatel
 Taliya Communications
 Telecommunication Company of Iran

References

ITU allocations list
Iran Intelligent Network

Iran
Telecommunications in Iran